Deborah M. Pratt is an American actress, writer, and television producer.

Early life
Pratt was born and raised in Chicago, Illinois, the daughter of Geraldine (née Bryant) and Col. Bertram Roberson Pratt, a vice president of Pullman Heritage Bank. Her parents were both of African-American and Creole descent.

Career
Pratt was a co-executive producer and a writer on the Quantum Leap TV series, which was created by her then-husband, Donald Bellisario. Pratt also frequently starred in the show as both the narrator and the voice of Ziggy.

Pratt also acted in various television series, including Magnum, P.I., Happy Days, The New Odd Couple, Benson, and Airwolf. In 2000, she directed Cora Unashamed for Masterpiece Theatres The American Collection. In 2009, she reprised her role as Ziggy for the Quantum Leap fan film, A Leap to Di For. Pratt has also published two books.

Filmography

Film

Television

References

External links

 Deborah Pratt biodata , thevisionquest.com 
  ActorsE Chat Show appearance, actorsentertainment.com

21st-century American novelists
Actresses from Chicago
African-American women writers
African-American film directors
African-American actresses
American film actresses
American film directors
American people of Creole descent
American television actresses
Television producers from Illinois
American women television producers
American television writers
American voice actresses
American women novelists
Living people
American women film directors
American women television writers
Writers from Chicago
21st-century American women writers
Novelists from Illinois
African-American screenwriters
Screenwriters from Illinois
Bellisario family
African-American novelists
20th-century American actresses
21st-century American actresses
Year of birth missing (living people)